The Women's 50 metre butterfly competition of the 2018 European Aquatics Championships was held on 8 and 9 August 2018.

Records
Prior to the competition, the existing world and championship records were as follows.

Results

Heats
The heats were started on 8 August at 09:26.

Swim-off
The swim-off was held on 8 August at 10:14.

Semifinals
The semifinals were started on 8 August at 17:10.

Semifinal 1

Semifinal 2

Final
The final was started on 9 August at 16:45.

References

Women's 50 metre butterfly